Raka Cahyana Rizky (born 24 February 2004) is an Indonesian professional footballer who plays as a attacking midfielder or right winger for Liga 1 club Persija Jakarta and the Indonesia national under-20 team.

Club career

Persija Jakarta
He was signed for Persija Jakarta to play in Liga 1 in the 2021 season. Cahyana made his first-team debut on 19 September 2021 in a match against Persipura Jayapura at the Indomilk Arena, Tangerang.

International career
On 30 May 2022, Cahyana made his debut for an Indonesian youth team U-20 against a Venezuela U-20 squad in the 2022 Maurice Revello Tournament in France. And on June 2, in a match 2022 Maurice Revello Tournament against Ghana U20, Cahyana made his first international goal.

Career statistics

Club

Notes

References

External links
 Raka Cahyana at Soccerway
 Raka Cahyana at Liga Indonesia

2004 births
Living people
People from Banyumas Regency
Sportspeople from Central Java
Indonesian footballers
Liga 1 (Indonesia) players
Persija Jakarta players
Indonesia youth international footballers
Association football midfielders